Brinsworth is a village and civil parish in the Metropolitan Borough of Rotherham, in South Yorkshire, England. It is situated close to the River Rother between Rotherham (to the north-east) and Sheffield (to the south-west). At the time of the 2001 census it had a population of 8,950, reducing to 8,789 at the 2011 Census.

Brinsworth became a new separate ward in May 2021 which covers the whole village beyond the parish boundary. This change is to accommodate an expanding neighbouring ward of Rother Vale - that includes a new mainly private housing estate of Waverley which has around 3,800 homes with its own school and lake frontage.

From Brinsworth people can now walk alongside the lakes at Waverley to Rother Valley Country Park, Gulliver's Valley theme park resort and the new Waleswood Caravan and Camping park.

History
Remains thought to be part of the Roman road called Icknield Street, which passed the fort, were discovered on White Hill in 1948, between Brinsworth and Canklow. In addition, walls of buildings were traced including what may have been a temple platform, and pottery dating from the late 2nd and 3rd centuries was found.

This area has been suggested by historian Michael Wood as one of the possible locations for the Battle of Brunanburh, which took place in 937, although he also strongly believes it to be near Burghwallis, outside of Doncaster. The earliest known written reference to Brinsworth appears in the 1086 Domesday Book, where it is referred to as "Brynesford", a name thought to mean 'Bryni's ford'. At this time the land was mostly 'waste', having been decimated in the 'Harrying of the North' that took place following the Norman conquest, and it was divided between Roger de Busli and William de Percy.

The village grew in the 19th century as coal mines were sunk in the surrounding area, and by 1891 the population was 1,656. New housing estates were built around Brinsworth in the 1950s, increasing the population to its current level.

Notable buildings
Brinsworth has three primary schools: Brinsworth Howarth, situated next to Catcliffe on Whitehill lane; Brinsworth Whitehill, at the very highest point of Brinsworth at its centre; and Brinsworth Manor, the largest, located in the middle of the old village. The village secondary school is Brinsworth Academy.

The Church of England parish church is St Andrew and is joined with St Mary at Catcliffe.

Local public houses are the Fairways Hotel, Phoenix Sports and Social Club, Brinsworth Social Club, the Three Magpies, Stop Inn Time (micro pub), the Yorkshire Terrier and the Waverley. Two recently closed pubs were the Atlas and the Sidings. The Sidings re-opened as a free house in December 2010, and closed again in April 2014.  The Sidings Re-opened late 2014 (exact date needed) as the Thirsty flame Bar & Grill and is still operating to this day

See also
Listed buildings in Brinsworth

References and notes

External links

 Rotherhamweb
 Parish council
 

Villages in South Yorkshire
Geography of the Metropolitan Borough of Rotherham
Civil parishes in South Yorkshire